is a Japanese kickboxer. He is the former K-1 Super Featherweight champion, K-1 Featherweight champion and K-1 Super Bantamweight champion. He is the only three weight champion in K-1 history. A generational talent, Takeru is considered to be one of the greatest kickboxers in the modern history of the sport, alongside his compatriot Tenshin Nasukawa.

A professional competitor since 2008, Segawa became the K-1 Super Bantamweight champion when he defeated Taiga Kawabe in the finals of the 2015 K-1 Super Bantamweight Grand Prix, on April 19, 2015. He became the K-1 Featherweight champion when he defeated Kaito Ozawa in the finals of the 2016 K-1 Featherweight Grand Prix, on November 3, 2016, thus becoming the first two-weight champion in K-1 history. He further became the K-1 Super Featherweight champion after defeating Kosuke Komiyama in the finals of the 2018 K-1 Super Featherweight Grand Prix, on March 21, 2018, thus becoming the first and only three weight champion in K-1 history.

As of September 2020, he is the #1 ranked Bantamweight and the #1 pound-for-pound kickboxer in the world by Combat Press. He's been ranked the #1 P4P kickboxer since June 2019, and first entered the P4P list in October 2015. He was ranked the #1 flyweight by Combat Press from May 2019, until August 2020. Previous to that, he was ranked as the #1 bantamweight by Combat Press from April 2018 until April 2019.

Personal life
As a child, Takeru was a fan of both pro-wrestling and kickboxing. He was inspired to pursue kickboxing as a professional career after seeing Andy Hug win the 1996 K-1 Grand Prix. After being expelled from highschool, three months into his first year, he decided to move to Thailand where he trained striking full-time. As he was training, he also attended a correspondence school, which would enable him to participate in K-1 Koshien tournaments.  After graduating from high school, Takeru began training at Team Dragon under Kensaku Maeda.

Takeru has two siblings, an older and younger sister. Before deciding to become a professional prizefighter, Takeru was studying to become a childcare worker.

Takeru opened his YouTube channel on April 15, 2020.

Fighting style
Takeru is notable for using a high volume and variety of front leg kicks. He makes use of the lead leg push kicks and snap kicks. True to his karate background, he uses the lead leg round and triangle kick as well, which he will throw should his opponent circle to the left. Alongside these, he uses the lead leg head kick. To transfer power into his lead leg, however, Takeru must first place his rear leg underneath his center of gravity, which leaves him exposed on one leg, squared and without an option to retreat, should his lead leg kick be deflected or round kick blocked. To adjust to this when fighting southpaws, he sticks to step up lead leg low kicks and rear leg knees.

The lead leg attack don't merely serve to score points, or debilitate and exhaust opponents, but to push the opponent to the ropes. His main strikes, once the opponent is backed up, are the right hook to the body and the stepping right knee. He'll combine the right hook with the left hook to the head, or combine a right-left to the body. Due to his ability to strike with the lead leg, he'll often use it to feint a kick, before placing his leg down on the mat and throwing power strikes.

Kickboxing career

Early career
Takeru made his professional debut at KAKUMEI NAGOYA 3 ～, when he was scheduled to fight Bonta. He won the fight by a unanimous decision.

His next kickboxing bout came two years after his first one. He was scheduled to make his promotional appearance with K-1 at Krush 12, when he was set to face Hirofumi Kamata. He won the fight by a technical knockout, managing to knock Kamata down three times inside of the second round.

Takeru was scheduled to fight Katsumi Masuda at Krush-EX 2011 Final. Takeru dominated Kamata through all three rounds, with Kamata spending the entire fight on the defensive. Takeru won the fight by unanimous decision, with two judges scoring the bout 30-27 in his favor and the last judge scoring it 30-26 in his favor.

Takeru was scheduled to fight Kazuki Tanaka at Krush 17. He won the fight by a late second-round knockout. Takeru extended his six-fight winning streak with a first-round body-shot knockout of Masanori Shimada.

Takeru was scheduled to fight Yuki Kyotani at Krush 19. Kyotani managed to knock down Takeru in the first round, and kept him staggered throughout the rest of it. The referee called in the ringside doctor at the end of the round, who stopped the fight, as Takeru had suffered a broken nose. It would prove to be Takeru's only loss in over a decade and a half.

Takeru was scheduled to fight Masato Yuki at Krush YOUTH GP. He won the fight by unanimous decision, winning all three rounds of the bout. He would go on to win his next two fights by stoppage, knocking Yuya Suzuki out with a right hook at Krush-EX 2012 vol.5 and Katsuki Sakaki with a right cross at Krush 25.

Krush Featherweight champion

Krush Featherweight tournament
His 9-1 kickboxing record earned him a place in the Krush Featherweight tournament, being scheduled to fight the quarterfinal bout against Kenta Yagami at Krush 26. Takeru won the fight by a counter right hook knockout in the first round. Advancing to the semifinals, Takeru faced the two-time Kyokushin karate world champion Yuzo Suzuki at Krush 27. Takeru won the fight by unanimous decision, winning two of the three rounds on the judges scorecards. He advanced to the finals, where he faced the former ISKA, RISE and AJKF champion Nobuchika Terado. Takeru won the fight by unanimous decision.

Krush Featherweight title reign
His first two post-tournament fights were non-title bouts. He was first scheduled to fight Lee Solbin at Krush 30. He spent the first round landing strikes to the body with knees and punches. Takeru continued landing to Solbin's body in the second round, which resulted in a body shot knockout, near the end of the round. For his second non-title bout, Takeru was scheduled to fight Katsuya Goto at Krush 35. Takeru won the fight by a second-round knockout.

For his first title defense, Takeru was scheduled to fight Shota Kanbe at Krush 39. After a close first round, Takeru managed to knock Kanbe down in the second round. Although he was not able to finish Kanbe, Takeru nonetheless won the fight by unanimous decision. Takeru was scheduled to make his second title defense against Yuzo Suzuki at Krush 44. He thoroughly dominated his opponent, knocking him down in both the first and second rounds. Takeru won the fight by a wide unanimous decision, with all three judges scoring the bout 30-25 in his favor. 

Takeru was scheduled to fight a super-fight with the Krush Bantamweight champion Taiga Kawabe at K-1 World GP 2014 -65kg Championship Tournament. Takeru won the fight by a highlight reel spinning backfist, 13 seconds into the third round. In his post-fight speech, Takeru stated his wish to make kickboxing as big as football and baseball.

Takeru was scheduled to make his third and final title defense against Yuta Otaki at Krush 51. During the sole round of this high paced bout, Takeru managed to knock his opponent down twice, with Otaki finally verbally submitting 89 seconds into the fight.

K-1 Super Bantamweight champion

K-1 Super Bantamweight Grand Prix
Takeru was scheduled to participate in the 2015 K-1 Super Bantamweight World Grand Prix, held at K-1 World GP 2015 -55kg Championship Tournament on April 19, 2015. Takeru was scheduled to face Alexandre Prilip in the tournament quarterfinals, while the other three quarterfinal bouts were contested between Shota Takiya and Danial Williams, Nobuchika Terado and Rui Botelho, as well as between Taiga Kawabe and Soufiane El Haji.

His quarter final bout with Prilip started tentatively, before Takeru upped the pressure towards the end of the second round and scored a knockdown with a right overhand. Takeru resumed pressuring in the second round, scoring the second knockdown midway through the second round with a combination of an uppercut, bodyshot and low kick. The fight was stopped as Prilip was unable to beat the eight-count.

Advancing to the semifinals, Takeru faced the former two-time Krush Super Bantamweight champion Shota Takiya. Takeru made quick work of his opponent, scoring a knockdown with a combination of punches after just 30 seconds. The fight was stopped a minute later, as Takiya was unable to continue intelligently defending himself.

Takeru faced the reigning Krush Super Bantamweight champion Taiga Kawabe in the tournament finals. The fight was a rematch of their November 3, 2014 match, which Takeru won by a third-round knockout. Takeru knocked his opponent down twice in their second meeting: the first knockdown as a result of a knee to the body in the first round, while the second knockdown was a result of a right hook in the third round. Although he was unable to finish Taiga, Takeru won the fight by a wide unanimous decision. Two of the three judges scored the bout 30-25 for Takeru, while the third judges scored it 30-26 in his favor. Combat Press would later name this fight as their 2015 "Fight of the Year".

Takeru vs. Hamech
In his first appearance as a K-1 champion, Takeru was scheduled to fight a non-title bout with the reigning WBC Muaythai World Super Bantamweight champion Hakim Hamech at K-1 World GP 2015 -70kg Championship Tournament on July 4, 2015. Following a close first round, Takeru began to take over the fight from the second round onward, scoring a knockdown with a left hook at the very end of the round. He was unable to finish Hamech, but did enough to win the fight by unanimous decision, with all three judges awarding him a 30-27 scorecard.

Takeru vs. Bongiovanni
Takeru was scheduled to make the first, and only, career defense of his Super Bantamweight title against Charles Bongiovanni at K-1 World GP 2015 The Championship on November 21, 2015. Biongiovanni had earned the right to challenge Takeru with a first-round knockout of Danial Williams in a title eliminator match, which was contested on September 22, 2015. Takeru suffered the first knockdown of the fight midway through the first round, as he was dropped with a straight. He rebounded in the second round, scoring a standing knockdown at the 1:18 minute mark. He scored two more knockdowns over the course of the following thirty seconds, which forced the referee to stop the bout.

Takeru was scheduled to fight Yang Ming at Rizin World Grand Prix 2015: Part 2 - Iza on December 31, 2015. It was his first fight outside of K-1 in over seven years. Takeru won the fight by a second-round knockout, dropping Ming with a right cross in the last seconds of the round.

Takeru vs. Yoadsenchai
Takeru was scheduled to fight another non-title bout against Yoadsenchai Sor.Sopit at K-1 World GP 2016 -60kg Japan Tournament on April 24, 2016. Takeru won the fight by a technical knockout, knocking Yoadsenchai down three times in the third round. He scored the first knockdown with a spinning backfist, the second with a right hook, while the third one was a standing knockdown, as Yoadsenchai was unable to defend himself. Yoadsenchai was furthermore give two yellow cards during the second round for catching kicks.

Takeru vs. Ozawa
Takeru was scheduled to fight his last fight as a super bantamweight against Kaito Ozawa at K-1 World GP 2016 -65kg World Tournament on June 24, 2016. The fight was a non-title bout, the same as his previous three. He won the fight by unanimous decision, winning two of the three rounds on two of the judges scorecards. The fight was held in front of a sold-out Yoyogi National Gymnasium, and was further watched by 880 000 live viewers over AbemaTV. It was, at the time, the most viewed sports program in AbemaTV history.

Featherweight career

K-1 Featherweight Grand Prix
After defeating Kaito Ozawa, Takeru vacated the K-1 super bantamweight title with the intention of participating in the upcoming K-1 Featherweight World Tournament, held on November 3, 2016. Takeru was scheduled to face Jamie Whelan in the tournament quarterfinals. The remaining quarterfinal pairings pitted Kaito Ozawa against Josh Tonna, Elias Mahmoudi against Ryuma Tobe and Yun Qi against Shota Kanbe. 

Takeru won the quarterfinal bout by unanimous decision, with all three judges awarding him a 30-26 scorecard. He scored the sole knockdown of the fight in the second round, dropping Wheelan with a left hook. Advancing to the semifinals, Takeru faced Yun Qi. He knocked Qi out with a series of left-right hooks, near the end of the second round. In the tournament finals, Takeru fought a rematch with Kaito Ozawa. Takeru was more dominant in the rematch, scoring multiple knockdowns over Ozawa on route to a wide unanimous decision victory. All three of the judges scored the fight 30-25 for Takeru. He became the first two weight champion in K-1 history.

Although he was initially scheduled to take part in a New Year's Eve RIZIN event, Takeru was not medically cleared. It was later revealed that he had suffered a hand injury during his fight with Yun Qi, and would take time off from competition to heal.

K-1 Featherweight title reign
Takeru was scheduled to make his return to competition against Victor Saravia at K-1 World GP 2017 Super Bantamweight Championship Tournament. Takeru won the fight by a third-round knockout, dropping Saravia with a right straight, followed by a left hook. Takeru was afterwards scheduled to fight Buvaisar Paskhaev, in another non-title bout, at K-1 World GP 2017 Super Welterweight Championship Tournament. He knocked Paskhaev out with a combination of body shots, midway through the third round.

Takeru was scheduled to make his first and only featherweight title defense against Wang Junguang at K-1 World GP 2017 Welterweight Championship Tournament. Takeru won the closely contested affair by unanimous decision. Two of the judges scored the fight 30-29 for Takeru, while the last one scored it 30-28 in his favor.

Super Featherweight career

Super Featherweight Grand Prix
After his successful title defense against Junguang, Takeru vacated the featherweight title and moved up in weight to challenge for the K-1 Super Featherweight title, held at the time by Taiga Kawabe. However, due to contractual problems between K-1 and Taiga's TRY HARD GYM, the bout was later scrapped. As the title was left vacant with Taiga's departure from K-1, the organization decided to organize a tournament to determine the new champion. Takeru was scheduled to fight Stavros Exakoustidis in the tournament quarterfinals.

Takeru won the quarterfinal bout against Exakoustidis by a unanimous decision, with two of the judges awarding him a 30-28 scorecard, while the third judge scored the fight 29-28 in his favor. Near the end of the third round, Takeru staggered Exakoustidis, although he was unable to knock him down. Advancing to the semifinals, Takeru faced Masanobu Goshu. He won the fight by knockout, two and half minutes into the first round, after landing a right straight off of a step-up knee feint. Goshu was unable to beat the eight-count. Takeru met Kosuke Komiyama in the tournament finals. He won the fight by a third-round technical knockout, knocking Komiyama three times in the third round. The first knockdown came as a result of two body shots, the second knockdown as a result of a right hook, while the third and final knockdown came as a result of a right straight. Takeru became the first kickboxer in K-1 history to hold belts across three different weight classes.

Takeru vs. Gallardo
Takeru was scheduled to fight the two-time ISKA World champion, and the 2018 WLF tournament winner, Daniel Puertas Gallardo at K-1 World GP 2018: inaugural Cruiserweight Championship Tournament. Mid-way through the first round, Takeru scored the first knockdown of the fight, hitting Gallardo with a right overhand off of a front kick feint. Pressuring after the fight resumed, Takeru knocked Gallardo out with a combination of hooks with 52 seconds left in the first round.

Takeru vs. Kouzi
During the post-fight press conference, Takeru stated that he was open to defending his K-1 title against Koji. Koji had first called out Takeru following the latter's Super Featherweight Grand Prix victory, calling for a December title fight. Takeru was scheduled to fight Koji, for the K-1 Super Featherweight title, at K-1 World GP 2018: K-1 Lightweight World's Best Tournament.The fight was held inside of a sold-out Edion Arena Osaka, with 8,000 spectators watching the fight. Takeru completely dominated his opponent, winning a wide unanimous decision, with all three judges scoring the bout 30-25 in his favor.

Takeru vs. Yodkitsada
Takeru was scheduled to fight the 2019 Rajadamnern Stadium featherweight champion Yodkitsada Yuthachonburi, in the main event of K-1 World GP 2019: K’FESTA 2. Takeru won the fight by a second-round knockout. With 30 seconds left in the second round, Takeru countered Yodkitsada's linear blitz with a right straight, which resulted in a knockdown. Immediately after the fight restarted, Takeru pressured with a combination of right and left hooks, resulting in a knockout, with 19 seconds remaining in the round. During the fight with Yodkitsada, Takeru suffered a tendon rupture in his right hand, which required surgery. Following the surgery, Takeru stated it would take him at least six months to recover from the operation.

Takeru vs. Murakoshi
During a K-1 press conference, held at the Edmont Metropolitan Hotel on September 20, 2019, it was announced that Takeru would fight the former RISE Bantamweight and K-1 Featherweight champion Yuta Murakoshi at K-1 World GP 2019 Yokohamatsuri. The fight was scheduled as the co-main event, with the final of the K-1 Featherweight Grand Prix serving as the event headliner. This was the first event that K-1 had held in Yokohama in its newer history. Takeru, Kenta Hayashi and Haruma Saikyo were the three fighters chosen to meet with the prefecture governor Yuji Kuroiwa. Takeru had a lukewarm start to the fight, being unable to successfully pressure the outfighting Murakoshi. His output increased in the second half of the third round, which was reflected in the scorecards, with two of three judges scoring the fight 30-29 in Takeru's favor and the third judge scoring the bout as a draw.

Takeru vs. Petchdam
Takeru was scheduled to fight Adam Bouarourou at K-1: K’Festa 3. The fight was scheduled as a double title fight, with both Takeru's K-1 and Bouarourou's ISKA title being on the line. The fight was later cancelled, as the Japanese government imposed travel restrictions to stop the spread of COVID-19, from March 31st to April 30th. Accordingly, Takeru was rescheduled to fight the former BBTV Featherweight champion Petchdam Petchkiatpetch, who took the fight on a four days notice. Takeru dominated the bout, managing to knock his opponent down with a right straight near the end of the first round. Takeru continued to pressure as the fight resumed, knocking Petchdam out with a right hook, 49 seconds into the second round.

Takeru vs. Pettas
Takeru was scheduled to fight the reigning Krush Super Featherweight champion Leona Pettas at K-1 World GP 2020 in Fukuoka. Due to his stature, being 10 cm taller than Takeru, and his impressive nine fight winning streak, Pettas was considered to be the toughest challenge in Takeru's recent career. At the time of the bouts scheduling, Takeru was considered the #1 and Pettas the #3 ranked kickboxer in the world under 60kg. Prior to his title defense, Takeru fought an exhibition match with Kizaemon Saiga, which ended in a pre-determined draw. On October 9, 2020, it was revealed that the fight was postponed, as Takeru had suffered a fracture in his left hand during training, which would require surgery.

The fight was rescheduled for January 24, 2021. However, on January 7, 2021, the Japanese government declared a state of emergency due to the COVID-19 pandemic, which forced K-1 to postpone the fight. The fight was rescheduled for K-1: K’Festa 4. The fight was postponed for the third time, as another state of emergency was declared due to the COVID-19 pandemic. The fight was rescheduled for K-1 World GP 2021: K’Festa 4 Day.2. The fourth time that the bout was scheduled, Takeru and Pettas were considered the #1 and #2 kickboxers in the world under 60kg, respectively.

The fight started out evenly, with Pettas utilizing his reach advantage to score points from the outside, while Takeru attempted to cut off the ring and pressure. Half-way through the first round, Takeru landed an inadvertent groin strike, which resulted in a break. After the break, Takeru proved more successful, managing to knock Pettas down with a left hook near the end of the round. His pressure intensified in the second round, and he scored a knockout with a combination of punches 70 seconds into the round.

Takeru later revealed he had come into the fight without allowing his hand to fully heal, and had re-injured his hand during the fight.

Takeru vs. Nasukawa
Tenshin Nasukawa had been calling out Segawa since June 8, 2015. But due to contractual obligations, both fighters were not able to meet in the ring. At that time, K-1 and RISE were in a "Kickboxing Cold War" since 2010. On August 5, 2015, Segawa told the media that he is interested in fighting Nasukawa if K-1 can organize it. K-1 Japan group producer, Mitsuru Miyata, demanded that Nasukawa sign an exclusive contract with K-1 to be able to make the fight happen. 

On November 21, 2015, Segawa made his first defense of his K-1 -55 kg world title against Charles Bongiovanni, he won the fight by TKO. After the match, during the in-ring interview, Segawa announced his desire to fight in Rizin, two weeks after Nasukawa announced the same. When Segawa returned backstage, Nasukawa approached him and demanded the fight. The fight can happen in Rizin even with the RISE and K-1 cold war. During the press conference, Segawa mentioned that he did not recognize Nasukawa and could not understand what he was saying due to the crowd noise and thought he was just a fan. Segawa confirmed that he is willing to accept the fight if offered. After the event, Nasukawa tweeted that Segawa agreed to fight him on New Year's Eve.

On December 8, 2015, Rizin announced a fight between Segawa and Chinese fighter, Yang Ming, for their New Year's Eve event. At the press conference, Rizin president, Sakakibara, acknowledged requests to make a Segawa vs. Nasukawa fight, however, he said there was not enough time to promote the fight and promised to try to make it happen in 2016.

On June 18, 2017, after Segawa knocked out Buvaisar Paskhaev, K-1 commentator, Masato, expressed his desire to see Segawa fight Nasukawa but the two other commentators ignored his comments. Two days later, K-1's official YouTube channel uploaded the full fight video of Segawa and Paskhaev but a few hours later it was deleted and re-uploaded without Masato's comments.

On August 29, 2017 Rizin executive Nobuhiko Takada said on Twitter "Two of the biggest superstars of kickboxing, Takeru vs Tenshin Nasukawa should be made right now! If this super-fight will not happen due to the (sic) cold war, it is heinous crime! Let's make this! Make miracle!" A few hours later a K-1 broadcaster trolled Takada on Twitter. A few days later, Takada apologized and promised to never talk about a fighter from another organization ever again and deleted every tweet he had about Nasukawa vs Segawa.

On December 31, 2017, Nasukawa won Rizin's Kickboxing -57 kg tournament. In an attempt to quash the cold war and influence K-1 and RISE to make the Segawa fight, Nasukawa made sure the show was being broadcast live so Rizin was not able to cut any of his comments. Post-fight, in the ring, Nasukawa engaged the crowd by asking who they want him to fight next and the crowd screamed Segawa's name. In February 2018, M-1 Sports Media, which operates K-1, filed a lawsuit against Tenshin, his father Hiroyuki, RISE president Takashi Ito and Rizin president Sakakibara. According to the lawsuit, it all started three years ago when Nasukawa called out Segawa to fight. More recently during Rizin's New Year's Eve event when Nasukawa asked the audience who they want him to fight next. They claim that it is an unfair business practice to involve another fighter's name from a different organization.

On March 16, 2018, RISE president Takashi Ito, former K-1 fighter Hiroya and his lawyer, accused K-1 Japan Group's exclusive contract, illegal based on the competition law. Hiroya's lawyer told the media, that the way K-1's contract work makes you not fight for a year for your contract to expire. Every fight you make with the organization, extends your contract for another year from your last fight and the only way to get out of the contract is not get paid for a year. Hiroya cites this as the reason why Segawa could not fight Nasukawa as he knows Segawa as a friend and will not back down to a fight.

At a press conference held on December 24, 2021, Rizin FF president Nobuyuki Sakakibara announced that Takeru would fight Tenshin Nasukawa in a neutral venue in June 2022, in what was Nasukawa's last professional bout as a kickboxer. The fight was scheduled to take place at 58 kilograms, while both fighters had to weigh less than 62 kilograms on fight day. At the time of the fight's scheduling, Takeru and Nasukawa were considered to be the best pound for pound kickboxers in the world, excepting Superbon Banchamek. On April 1, 2022 the bout was confirmed to happen on June 19, 2022 at the Tokyo Dome, marking the return of a kickboxing headlined event to the venue for the first time since 2006. The rules for the bout were announced six days later: it was to be contested across three three-minute rounds, under the RISE ruleset, with one additional round in case of a draw. The entire event was broadcast by Abema TV as a pay per view, while a two hour portion (which included Takeru's bout with Nasukawa) was also broadcast by Fuji TV. On May 31 it was revealed that Fuji TV had opted out of broadcasting the bout, due to allegations that RIZIN president Sakakibara was dealing with the yakuza.

In front of a sold-out audience of 56,399 at the Tokyo Dome, Takeru lost the fight by decision. Immediately before the end of the opening round, Nasukawa was able to knock Takeru down with a sharp left hook counter to his right straight, which resulted in all five judges scoring the round 10–8 in his favor. The second round was more even, with four judges scoring it an even 10–10 draw, while the fifth judge scored it 10–9 for Tenshin. Following the third and final round, the judges awarded a unanimous decision to Nasukawa, with total scores of 29–28, 30–28, 30–28, 30–28 and 30–27. The event sold around 500,000 PPVs.

Free agent
On June 27, 2022 K-1 held a press conference at which Takeru announced he was taking a break from competition in order to heal physically and mentally. He revealed he had been suffering from various injuries including spondylolisthesis and damage to his MCL and ACL. He also revealed he had been struggling with depression and panic disorder. He announced that he would pursue a new goal once healed without precising a timeframe. He subsequently relinquished his K-1 Super Featherweight title.

On August 4, 2022, Takeru underwent right hand surgery, in order to repair the tendons in his middle finger. On the same day, Takeru announced over social media that he would also operate his knee during the next few weeks, to heal damage in the ACL and MCL ligaments. He successfully underwent knee surgery on August 19. On November 1, 2022, Takeru announced on his social media that his contract with K-1 had expired in the end of October, making him a free agent. Takeru made his first post-surgery professional appearance on November 6, 2022, as he faced former teammate Koki in an exhibition bout at a GAINA promoted event in his native Yonago. The fight ended in a pre-determined draw.

Titles and accomplishments

Professional
Krush
 2013 Krush Featherweight Championship
Three successful title defenses

K-1
 2015 K-1 World GP Super Bantamweight World Grand Prix Winner
 2015 K-1 Super Bantamweight Championship 
One successful title defense
 2016 K-1 World GP Featherweight World Grand Prix Winner
 2016 K-1 Featherweight Championship 
One successful title defense
 2018 K-1 World GP Super Featherweight World Grand Prix Winner
 2018 K-1 Super Featherweight Championship 
Two successful title defenses

Amateur
Shin Karate
2011 Shin Karate 22nd All Japan K-2 Grand Prix BUDO-RA Award
2011 Shin Karate 116th K-2 Tournament Lightweight Winner
2010 Shin Karate 114th & 115th K-2 Tournament Lightweight Winner

Awards
K-1 Awards
 2017 Fight of the Year 
 2018 Fighter of the Year
 2019 Fight of the Year 
 2020 Knockout of the Year (vs Petchdam Petchkiatpetch)
 2021 Fight of the Year (vs. Leona Pettas)
CombatPress.com
2015 Fight of the Year 
2018 Male Fighter of the Year
eFight.jp
 Fighter of the Month (May 2013, April 2015, November 2016 and March 2018)

Fight record

|-  style="background:#Fbb;"
| 2022-06-19|| Loss ||align=left| Tenshin Nasukawa || THE MATCH 2022 || Tokyo, Japan || Decision (Unanimous)|| 3 || 3:00
|-  style="background:#cfc;"
| 2021-03-28|| Win ||align=left| Leona Pettas || K-1 World GP 2021: K’Festa 4 Day.2 || Tokyo, Japan || KO (Punches) || 2||1:10 
|-
! style=background:white colspan=9 |
|-  style="background:#cfc;"
| 2020-03-22|| Win ||align=left| Petchdam Petchkiatpetch || K-1: K’Festa 3 || Saitama, Japan || KO (Punches) || 2|| 0:49
|-  style="background:#cfc;"
| 2019-11-24 || Win|| align=left| Yuta Murakoshi||  K-1 World GP 2019 Yokohamatsuri || Yokohama, Japan || Decision (Majority)|| 3 || 3:00
|-style="background:#cfc;"
| 2019-03-10|| Win|| align=left| Yodkitsada Yuthachonburi ||K-1 World GP 2019: K’FESTA 2|| Saitama, Japan ||  KO (Right Hook) || 2 || 2:41
|-style="background:#cfc;"
| 2018-12-08|| Win|| align=left| Kouzi || K-1 World GP 2018: K-1 Lightweight World's Best Tournament || Osaka, Japan ||  Decision (Unanimous) || 3 || 3:00
|-
! style=background:white colspan=9 |
|-

|-  bgcolor="#CCFFCC"
| 2018-09-24 || Win || align=left| Daniel Puertas Gallardo || K-1 World GP 2018: inaugural Cruiserweight Championship Tournament || Saitama, Japan || KO (Punches) || 1 || 2:08
|-  bgcolor="#CCFFCC"
| 2018-03-21 || Win || align=left| Kosuke Komiyama || K-1 World GP 2018: K'FESTA.1 -60 kg World Tournament, Final || Saitama, Japan || TKO (3 Knockdowns) || 3 || 2:01
|-
! style=background:white colspan=9 |
|-

|-  bgcolor="#CCFFCC"
| 2018-03-21 || Win || align=left| Masanobu Goshu|| K-1 World GP 2018: K'FESTA.1 -60 kg World Tournament, Semi Finals || Saitama, Japan || KO (Punches) || 1 || 2:25
|-  bgcolor="#CCFFCC"
| 2018-03-21 || Win || align=left| Stavros Exakoustidis || K-1 World GP 2018: K'FESTA.1 -60 kg World Tournament, Quarter Finals || Saitama, Japan || Decision (Unanimous) || 3 || 3:00
|-  
|-  bgcolor="#CCFFCC"
| 2017-09-18|| Win || align=left| Wang Junguang ||K-1 World GP 2017 Welterweight Championship Tournament|| Tokyo, Japan || Decision (Unanimous) || 3 || 3:00
|-
! style=background:white colspan=9 |
|-  
|-  bgcolor="#CCFFCC"
| 2017-06-18|| Win || align=left| Buvaisar Paskhaev|| K-1 World GP 2017 Super Welterweight Championship Tournament || Tokyo, Japan || KO (Body Punches) || 3 || 1:17
|-  
|-  bgcolor="#CCFFCC"
| 2017-04-22|| Win || align=left| Victor Saravia || K-1 World GP 2017 Super Bantamweight Championship Tournament || Tokyo, Japan || KO (Left Hook) || 3 || 2:20
|-
|-  style="background:#cfc;"
| 2016-11-03|| Win ||align=left| Kaito Ozawa || K-1 World GP 2016 Featherweight World Tournament, Final || Tokyo, Japan || Decision (Unanimous)|| 3 || 3:00
|-
! style=background:white colspan=9 |
|-
|-  style="background:#cfc;"
| 2016-11-03|| Win ||align=left| Yun Qi || K-1 World GP 2016 Featherweight World Tournament, Semi Finals || Tokyo, Japan || KO (Right Cross)|| 2 || 2:31
|-
|-  style="background:#cfc;"
| 2016-11-03|| Win ||align=left| Jamie Whelan || K-1 World GP 2016 Featherweight World Tournament, Quarter Finals || Tokyo, Japan || Decision (Unanimous)|| 3 || 3:00
|-  
|-  bgcolor="#CCFFCC"
| 2016-06-24 || Win || align=left| Kaito Ozawa || K-1 World GP 2016 -65kg World Tournament || Tokyo, Japan || Decision (Unanimous) || 3 || 3:00
|-  
|-  bgcolor="#CCFFCC"
| 2016-04-24 || Win || align=left| Yodsaenchai Sor.Sopit || K-1 World GP 2016 -60kg Japan Tournament || Tokyo, Japan || TKO (3 Knockdowns) || 3 || 0:47
|-
|-  style="background:#cfc;"
| 2015-12-31||| Win ||align=left| Yang Ming || Rizin World Grand Prix 2015: Part 2 - Iza || Saitama, Japan || KO (Right Cross)|| 2 || 2:59
|-  style="background:#cfc;"
| 2015-11-21|| Win ||align=left| Charles Bongiovanni || K-1 World GP 2015 The Championship  || Tokyo, Japan || TKO (3 Knockdowns) || 2 || 2:16
|-
! style=background:white colspan=9 |
|-  style="background:#cfc;"
| 2015-07-04|| Win ||align=left| Hakim Hamech || K-1 World GP 2015 -70kg Championship Tournament|| Tokyo, Japan || Decision (Unanimous) || 3 || 3:00
|-
|-  style="background:#cfc;"
| 2015-04-19||| Win ||align=left| Taiga|| K-1 World GP 2015 -55kg Championship Tournament, Final || Tokyo, Japan || Decision (Unanimous)|| 3 || 3:00
|-
! style=background:white colspan=9 |
|-
|-  style="background:#cfc;"
| 2015-04-19||| Win ||align=left| Shota Takiya ||K-1 World GP 2015 -55kg Championship Tournament, Semi Finals || Tokyo, Japan || TKO (Referee Stoppage)|| 1 || 1:31
|-
|-  style="background:#cfc;"
| 2015-04-19|| Win ||align=left| Alexandre Prilip || K-1 World GP 2015 -55kg Championship Tournament, Quarter Finals || Tokyo, Japan || KO (Body shot)|| 2 || 1:47
|-
|-  style="background:#cfc;"
| 2015-02-06|| Win ||align=left| Yuta Otaki|| Krush.51 || Tokyo, Japan || Decision (Unanimous)|| 3 || 3:00
|-
! style=background:white colspan=9 |
|-
|-  style="background:#cfc;"
| 2014-11-03|| Win ||align=left| Taiga || K-1 World GP 2014 -65kg Championship Tournament || Tokyo, Japan || KO (Spinning Back Fist)|| 3 || 0:13
|-
|-  style="background:#cfc;"
| 2014-08-09|| Win ||align=left| Yuzo Suzuki || Krush.44|| Tokyo, Japan || Decision (Unanimous)|| 3 || 3:00
|-
! style=background:white colspan=9 |
|-
|-  style="background:#cfc;"
| 2014-03-08|| Win ||align=left| Shota Kanbe || Krush.39 || Tokyo, Japan || Decision (Unanimous)|| 3 || 3:00
|-
! style=background:white colspan=9 |
|-
|-  style="background:#cfc;"
| 2013-12-14|| Win ||align=left| Katsuya Goto || Krush.35 || Tokyo, Japan || KO (Right Cross) || 1 || 2:33
|-
|-  style="background:#cfc;"
| 2013-08-11|| Win ||align=left| Lee Solbin || Krush.30 || Tokyo, Japan || KO (Left Hook to the Body)|| 2 || 2:11
|-
|-  style="background:#cfc;"
| 2013-05-12|| Win ||align=left| Nobuchika Terado || Krush.28 –58 kg Tournament Final || Tokyo, Japan || Decision (Unanimous) || 3 || 3:00
|-
! style=background:white colspan=9 |
|-
|-  style="background:#cfc;"
| 2013-03-20|| Win ||align=left| Yuzo Suzuki || Krush.27 –58 kg Tournament Semi Finals || Tokyo, Japan || Decision (Unanimous) || 3 || 3:00
|-
|-  style="background:#cfc;"
| 2013-01-26|| Win ||align=left| Kenta Yagami || Krush.26 –58 kg Tournament Quarter Finals || Tokyo, Japan || KO (Straight Right) || 1 || 2:21
|-
|-  style="background:#cfc;"
| 2012-12-14|| Win ||align=left| Katsuki Sakaki || Krush.25 || Tokyo, Japan || KO (Right Cross) || 1 || 1:43
|-
|-  style="background:#cfc;"
| 2012-10-21|| Win ||align=left| Yuya Suzuki || Krush-EX 2012 vol.5 || Tokyo, Japan || KO (Right Hook) || 2 || 2:58
|-
|-  style="background:#cfc;"
| 2012-09-09|| Win ||align=left| Masato Yuki || Krush YOUTH GP|| Tokyo, Japan || Decision (Unanimous)|| 3 || 3:00
|-
|-  style="background:#Fbb;"
| 2012-06-08|| Loss||align=left| Yuki Kyotani || Krush.19 || Tokyo, Japan || TKO (Doctor Stoppage/Broken nose) || 1 || 3:00
|-
|-  style="background:#cfc;"
| 2012-05-03|| Win ||align=left| Masanori Shimada|| Krush.18 || Tokyo, Japan || KO (Left Hook to the Body)|| 1 || 2:03
|-
|-  style="background:#cfc;"
| 2012-03-17|| Win ||align=left| Kazuki Tanaka|| Krush.17 || Tokyo, Japan || KO (Punches)|| 2 || 2:54
|-
|-  style="background:#cfc;"
| 2012-01-09|| Win ||align=left| Kazunori || Krush.15 || Tokyo, Japan || KO (Right Cross)|| 1 || 2:58
|-
|-  style="background:#cfc;"
| 2011-12-10|| Win ||align=left| Katsumi Masuda ||Krush-EX 2011 Final || Tokyo, Japan || Decision (Unanimous)|| 3 || 3:00
|-
|-  style="background:#cfc;"
| 2011-09-24 || Win ||align=left| Hirofumi Kamata ||Krush.12 || Tokyo, Japan || KO (3 Knockdowns) || 2 || 2:17
|-  style="background:#cfc;"
| 2010-02-14 || Win ||align=left||| Sityodtong International Stadium || Pattaya, Thailand || Decision || 3 || 3:00
|-  style="background:#cfc;"
| 2009-08-30 || Win|| align=left| Bonta || KAKUMEI NAGOYA 3 ～ Todoke! Ai to Yuuki to Low kick ～ || Nagoya, Japan || Decision (Unanimous)|| 3 || 3:00
|-  style="background:#fbb;"
| 2008-12-15 || Loss ||align=left| Eksiam Mor.KrungthepThonburi || Rajadamnern Stadium || Bangkok, Thailand || Decision || 5 || 3:00
|-
| colspan=9 | Legend:    

|-  style="background:#cfc;"
| 2010-03-29|| Win||align=left| Masashi Kodama || KAKUMEI 1st San'in Amateur Kickboxing Championship || San'in region, Japan || Decision  ||||
|-  style="background:#cfc;"
| 2010-03-21|| Win||align=left|  ||  || Japan || Decision  ||2||
|-  style="background:#cfc;"
| 2009-11-28|| Win||align=left|  ||  || Japan || Decision  ||2||
|-  style="background:#fbb;"
| 2009-06-14|| Loss||align=left| Hiroto Yamaguchi || K-1 Koshien 2009 Kansai Area Elimination Tournament Second Round || Saitama, Japan || Decision (Unanimous) ||1||2:00
|-  style="background:#cfc;"
| 2009-06-14|| Win||align=left|  || K-1 Koshien 2009 Kansai Area Elimination Tournament First Round || Saitama, Japan || KO ||1||
|-  style="background:#cfc;"
| 2009-02-01|| Win||align=left|  ||  || Osaka, Japan || KO ||3||
|-  style="background:#c5d2ea;"
| 2008-09-28|| Draw||align=left| Garo Kawano || 3rd Chugoku Amateur Kickboxing Championship || Hiroshima, Japan || Decision  || ||
|-  style="background:#cfc;"
| 2008-05-18|| Win||align=left| Asuki Nagai || KAKUMEI Challenge Kickboxing 15 || Osaka, Japan || Decision  ||2||
|-  style="background:#cfc;"
| 2008-04-20|| Win||align=left| || KAKUMEI Kickboxing  || Japan || Decision  ||2||
|-  style="background:#cfc;"
| 2007-09-09|| Win||align=left| ||   || Hiroshima, Japan || Decision (Majority) ||2||2:00
|-
| colspan=9 | Legend:

See also
 List of male kickboxers
 List of K-1 champions

References

Living people
1991 births
Japanese male kickboxers
Bantamweight kickboxers
Sportspeople from Tottori Prefecture
People from Yonago, Tottori
Kickboxing champions